Mann, was a paramilitary rank used by several Nazi Party paramilitary organizations between 1925 and 1945. The rank is most often associated with the Schutzstaffel (SS-Mann), but also was a rank of the SA, where Mann (SA-Mann) was the lowest enlisted rank and was the equivalent of a private.

In 1938, with the rise of the SS-Verfügungstruppe (later renamed the Waffen-SS), the SS changed the rank of Mann to Schütze, although it still retained the original SS rank of Mann for the Allgemeine-SS (general SS). The rank of Mann was junior to SS-Sturmmann.

In most Nazi Party organizations, the rank of Mann held no distinctive insignia. Some groups, however, granted a minor form of rank insignia such as a blank collar patch or simple shoulder board to denote the rank of Mann. (see right: SS rank insignia pattern from 1933)

Even lower ranks, e.g. Bewerber, Jungmann, Anwärter, Vollanwärter, were established in the mid-1930s as a recruit or candidate position, held by an individual seeking an appointment as a Mann in a Nazi Party paramilitary organization.

Insignia

Notes

Bibliography

External links 
SS Man killed in 1943

SS ranks